Rosângela Cristina Oliveira Santos (born December 20, 1990) is an American-born Brazilian track and field sprint athlete.

Career
Santos represented Brazil at the 2008 Summer Olympics in Beijing. She competed at the 4x100 metres relay together with Lucimar de Moura, Thaissa Presti and Rosemar Coelho Neto. In their first-round heat, they placed third behind Belgium and Great Britain but in front of Nigeria. Their time of 43.38 seconds was the fifth time overall out of sixteen participating nations. With this result, they qualified for the final in which they sprinted to a time of 43.14 seconds and the fourth place behind Nigeria, missing out on the bronze medal by 0.10 seconds. However, in 2016, the IOC stripped Russia of its gold medal due to doping, meaning Rosângela and her teammates inherited the bronze medal.

At Daegu 2011, Rosângela Santos went to the 4 × 100 m final, ranking eighth - with a new South American record (42.92) at the preliminary.

At the 2011 Pan American Games, in Guadalajara, she won the gold medal in the 100m, beating her personal record with a time of 11.22 seconds. She was only the second Brazilian in history to win this race in Pan Am Games. She also won the 4x100 meters relay alongside Vanda Gomes, Franciela Krasucki and Ana Claudia Lemos, with a time of 42.85, breaking the South American record.

At the 2012 Summer Olympics, Rosângela reached the semifinals of the 100m, with a mark of 11.07 s, which narrowly not accepted as a South American record due to +2,2 wind (the maximum allowed for approval of record is +2.0). In the semifinal, she came in 3rd place in her heat (losing to Carmelita Jeter and Veronica Campbell-Brown, who advanced to the final, and won silver and bronze medals), in a time of 11.17 mark, ranking 12th overall. She was the first Brazilian woman to achieve an Olympic spot in the semifinals of this event.

Still in London, the Brazilian 4 × 100 m relay women's team, composed of Ana Cláudia Lemos, Franciela Krasucki, Evelyn dos Santos, and Rosângela Santos broke the South American record in the qualifying of the race, with a time of 42.55, and went to the final in sixth place. In the final, the Brazilian relay ran a time of 42.91 and finished 7th.

At the 2013 World Championships in Moscow, the team composed by Ana Cláudia Lemos, Evelyn dos Santos, Franciela Krasucki and Rosângela Santos broke the South American record in the semifinals of the women's 4 × 100 m metres relay, with a time of 42.29 seconds. But, strangely and without official explanation, the CBAT (Brazilian Athletics Confederation) made a bizarre athlete change to the final lineup, putting Vanda Gomes (who had never run the relay) into the team instead of Rosângela Santos. More than that, they placed her on the anchor leg. In the final, Brazil came second, almost tied with Jamaica and with great possibility to win the silver medal and break the South American record when, at the last baton exchange, Vanda, who had been placed "in the line of fire" in a World Championships final without sufficient training to receive the baton, let the baton fall.

At the 2017 World Championships in London, Rosângela became the first Brazilian female sprinter ever to race 100 m in less than 11 seconds, clocking 10.91 in the semifinal to bag a new national and South American record to the distance. She placed 7th in the finals.

She has dual citizenship, American and Brazilian.

Personal bests
100 m: 10.91 s (wind: -0.2 m/s) –  London, 6 August 2017
200 m: 22.77 s (wind: +1.7 m/s) –  Birmingham, 7 June 2015
4x100 m: 42.29 s –  Moscow, 18 August 2013

International competitions

1Participated in the heats, but did not start in the final2Participated only in the heats, team did not finish in the final3Did not finish in the final4Disqualified in the final5Did not start in the final6Disqualified in the semifinals

References

External links
 
 

1990 births
Living people
Brazilian female sprinters
Olympic athletes of Brazil
Olympic bronze medalists for Brazil
Medalists at the 2008 Summer Olympics
Olympic bronze medalists in athletics (track and field)
Athletes (track and field) at the 2008 Summer Olympics
Athletes (track and field) at the 2012 Summer Olympics
Athletes (track and field) at the 2016 Summer Olympics
Athletes (track and field) at the 2011 Pan American Games
Athletes (track and field) at the 2019 Pan American Games
Athletes from Rio de Janeiro (city)
World Athletics Championships athletes for Brazil
Pan American Games gold medalists for Brazil
Pan American Games medalists in athletics (track and field)
Pan American Games athletes for Brazil
Athletes (track and field) at the 2018 South American Games
Medalists at the 2011 Pan American Games
Medalists at the 2019 Pan American Games
Troféu Brasil de Atletismo winners
Athletes (track and field) at the 2020 Summer Olympics
Olympic female sprinters
21st-century Brazilian women